WAFM could refer to:

WAFM (Australia), a radio station network serving the North West of Western Australia
WAFM (United States), a radio station (95.7 FM) licensed to Amory, Mississippi, United States